John Ely (October 8, 1774 – August 20, 1849) was an American physician and politician who served one term as a U.S. Representative from New York from 1839 to 1841.

Biography 
Born in Saybrook, Connecticut, Ely completed preparatory studies. He studied medicine, and practiced in Coxsackie, New York. He served as member of the State assembly in 1806 and 1812. He was one of the organizers of the New York State and Greene County Medical Societies in 1807 and also of the Albany Female Academy.

Congress 
Ely was elected as a Democrat to the Twenty-sixth Congress (March 4, 1839 – March 3, 1841).

Later career and death 
He resumed the practice of medicine. He died in Coxsackie, New York, August 20, 1849. He was interred in Old Coxsackie Cemetery.

References

1774 births
1849 deaths
People from Deep River, Connecticut
Democratic Party members of the New York State Assembly
People from Coxsackie, New York
Democratic Party members of the United States House of Representatives from New York (state)